Pietro Tripoli (born 26 February 1987) is an Italian footballer who currently plays for U.S.D. Lavagnese 1919.

Biography

Palermo
Born in Palermo, Sicily, Tripoli started his career at Sicilian club U.S. Città di Palermo. On 9 August 2006 Tripoli was signed by Serie C1 club Sambenedettese in a temporary deal.

Varese
On 6 July 2007 Tripoli was signed by Serie C2 club Varese in a temporary deal. On 18 July 2008 Varese signed Tripoli's 50% registration rights for a peppercorn of €500. The club won promotion to 2009–10 Lega Pro Prima Divisione at the end of 2008–09 season. In June 2009 the co-ownership deal was renewed. Varese finished as the runner-up of Group A of the third division, winning the promotion to Serie B. In June 2010 Palermo also gave up the remain 50% registration rights to Varese for free.

Tripoli played 27 times for Varese in 2010–11 Serie B. He spent 2011–12 Serie B season at Pro Vercelli on loan. Tripoli only managed to play 11 times for Varese in 2012–13 Serie B.

Parma
In summer 2013, Tripoli was signed by Serie A club Parma as a free agent. He was immediately loaned to Lega Pro Prima Divisione side Ascoli. On 25 July 2014 he was signed by Lega Pro Divinione Unica club Pistoiese in a temporary deal.

Return to Ascoli
After Parma's financial problem was exposed, Tripoli was re-signed by Ascoli for an undisclosed fee, in a -year contract.

Mantova FC
On 7 January 2016, it was confirmed, that Tripoli had signed a contract with Lega Pro side Mantova until June 2017.

Marsala
On 25 August 2018, he joined Serie D club Marsala.

Honours
 Lega Pro Seconda Divisione: 2009 (Varese)

References

External links
 Lega Serie B profile (data by Panini Digital) 
 

1987 births
Living people
Italian footballers
S.S.D. Varese Calcio players
F.C. Pro Vercelli 1892 players
Parma Calcio 1913 players
A.S. Sambenedettese players
U.S. Pistoiese 1921 players
Ascoli Calcio 1898 F.C. players
Mantova 1911 players
Cavese 1919 players
Savona F.B.C. players
U.S.D. Lavagnese 1919 players
Serie B players
Serie C players
Serie D players
Association football wingers